This article lists the islands in the River Thames, or at the mouth of a tributary (marked †), in England. It excludes human-made islands built as part of the building of forty-five two-gate locks which each accompany a weir, and islets subordinate to and forming part of the overall shape of another. The suffix -ey (pronounced today ) is common across England and Scotland and cognate with ait and meaning island, a term – as ait or eyot – unusually well-preserved on the Thames. A small minority of list entries are referred to as Island, Ait or Eyot and are vestiges, separated by a depression in the land or high-water-level gully.

Most are natural; others were created by excavation of an additional or replacement navigation channel, such as to provide a shorter route, a cut. Many result from accumulation of gravel, silt, wildfowl dung and plant decay and root strengthening, particularly from willows and other large trees. Unlike other large rivers, all today are considered fixed. All in the reaches below Lechlade have been protected against erosion by various combinations of canalisation of the river, building up with dredged material from the river bed, water reeds, concrete, cement, wood or sheet piling.

List of former islands
 Frog Island†, Rainham
 Isle of Dogs, Poplar, London

 Isle of Grain, Kent
 Thorney (or Thorney Island)† covered a broad area surrounding Westminster Abbey
 Bermondsey†, land and grounds of Bermondsey Abbey, formed by an anabranch (corollary channel) naturally dredged by the mouth of the Neckinger; a vestige of the channel is St Saviour's Dock.
 Battersea Formerly bounded by the Heath Brook,Falcon Brook and Thames.
Beyond the alluvium/silts of the estuary, by the English Channel and North Sea
Isle of Thanet†, Kent

List of islands 

 

The islands are listed in order upstream from the sea.

Oxford floodplain
In the Oxford area the river splits into several streams across the floodplain, which create numerous islands.   On the right bank a large island is created by Seacourt Stream, Botley Stream and Bulstake Stream, and there are smaller islands, including the large mainly built-up island now known as Osney, created by streams between Bulstake Stream and the Thames, including Osney Ditch.  The Oxford suburbs of Grandpont and New Hinksey are on an island created by Bulstake Stream, Hinksey Stream and Weirs Mill Stream.  Iffley Meadows is an island west of Iffley Lock, between Weirs Mill Stream, Hinksey Stream and the Thames.

On the left bank Fiddler's Island followed downstream by the built-up island historically known as Osney lie between Castle Mill Stream and the Thames. Cripley Meadow is also on an island formed by Fiddler's Island Stream, Castle Mill Stream and Sheepwash Channel.

Eton and Dorney
The status of Eton, Berkshire combined with Dorney is controversial. These are two mainly pre-1900-built small villages and their outlying localities: Eton Wick, Boveney and Dorney Reach. Much of these areas of land in the 19th century was marked by the Ordnance Survey "liable to floods" which led to pressure on authorities for flood protection, along with the more densely populated right bank.

They have been, since 2002, on a more protected man-made island formed by the Jubilee River, which is sometimes seen as an advanced flood relief channel rather than a channel of the Thames. As the Jubilee River is maintained with flow at all times, they may be coming to be accepted by publications as on an island of the Thames, reflecting their objective strict geographical status.

Lock islands
The construction of almost all locks on the Thames involved one or more artificial lock islands separating the lock from the weirs. These may have been created by building an artificial island in the river or by digging an artificial canal to contain the lock and turning the land between that and the river into an island. In many cases the lock island contains the lock keeper's house and can be accessed across the lock gates. Such lock islands are only listed above if they have a specific name of their own: all Thames locks are listed in Locks on the River Thames.

See also
Crossings of the River Thames
Tributaries of the River Thames
Eyots and Aits, Miranda Vickers, The History Press, pp 144, 2012.

Notes

River Thames

Thames
Lists of places in England